Shirley Sargent (July 12, 1927 – December 3, 2004) was an historian of the Yosemite area in the United States.

Sargent was born in Pasadena, California. Her father was a surveyor who helped rebuild the Tioga Road in Yosemite National Park, starting in 1936. So she had the good fortune of spending her childhood as a self-described "tomboy" in Yosemite. A rare crippling disease, dystonia musculorum deformans, kept her to a wheelchair from age 14, but that didn't stop her.

After writing Wawona's Yesterdays, she went on to write several other Yosemite History books, focusing on stories about people—making them come alive. Her most authoritative book is Galen Clark: Yosemite Guardian. Shirley self-published most of her books, with printer and historian Hank Johnson, under the name Flying Spur Press, and later under her own imprint Ponderosa Press. Other popular books of hers include Pioneers in Petticoats, John Muir in Yosemite National Park, Yosemite & Its Innkeepers, and Yosemite Chapel 1879-1989.

In 1961 she bought and built on Theodore Solomons' homesite in Foresta, California, which had only a fireplace surviving from a 1936 fire. She called her home Flying Spur, but it burned in the 1990 Yosemite A-Rock Fire, which also destroyed her historical papers. She rebuilt her home, but before her death she had to move to her parents' old home in Mariposa, California due to her illness. She died at her home there.

Selected Books by Shirley Sargent 
 Pipeline Down The Valley (fiction, 1955)
 Pat Hawly, Pre-school Teacher (fiction, 1958)
 Three Names for Katherine (with Hannah Smith) (fiction, 1960)
 The Heart-Holding Mountains (fiction, 1961)
 Wawona's Yesterdays (1961)
 Stop the Typewriters (fiction, 1963)
 Galen Clark: Yosemite Guardian (1964)
 Treasure at Flying Spur (fiction, 1965)
 Pioneers In Petticoats (1966)
 Ranger in Skirts (fiction, 1966)
 Yosemite Tomboy (fiction, 1967)
 Theodore Parker Lukens, Father of Forestry (1969)
 John Muir in Yosemite National Park (1972)
 Yosemite and Its Innkeeper (1975)
 The Ahwahnee (1977)
 Yosemite's High Sierra Camps (1977)
 The Yosemite Chapel, 1879-1979 (1979)
 Yosemite's Historic Wawona (1979)
 Dear Papa: Letters between John Muir & Wanda (1985)
 Solomons of the Sierra (1989)
 Enchanted Childhoods, Growing Up in Yosemite (1993)
 Protecting Paradise: Yosemite Rangers, 1898-1960 (1998)

External links
 Shirley Sargent: Yosemite Historian by Fernando Peñalosa (Quaking Aspen Books, 2006). Describes book and link includes obituary and bibliography, also by Fernando Peñalosa

1927 births
2004 deaths
American Latter Day Saints
Yosemite National Park
Writers from Pasadena, California
20th-century American novelists
20th-century American historians
American women historians
People from Mariposa County, California
20th-century American women writers
Novelists from California
Historians from California
21st-century American women